Holger Stark (Prof. Dr. Dr. h. c.) (born on 15 September 1962 in Bassum) is a German pharmacist and a university professor at the Heinrich Heine University in Düsseldorf. Stark is a co-inventor of the active ingredient Pitolisant, the only histamine H3 receptor antagonist approved to date.

Professional background 
Holger Stark studied pharmacy at the Free University of Berlin from 1982 to 1986 and received his license to practice as a pharmacist in 1987. From 1987 to 1991, he conducted his PhD research at the Institute of Pharmacy at the Free University of Berlin under the supervision of Professor  in cooperation with Professor Jean-Charles Schwartz (Bioprojet, Paris/France) and Professor Charon Robin Ganelli (London/England). In December 1991, he received his PhD (Dr. rer. nat.) with summa cum laude. After completing his PhD research, he worked on the development of new, selective ligands for dopamine D2-like receptors in cooperation with Dr. Pierre Sokoloff from the Unité de Neurobiology et Pharmacologie - INSERM (Paris/France). In 1999, he habilitated in pharmaceutical chemistry with the monograph “Dopamine D3 receptor ligands as pharmacological tools and potential medicinal products” while retaining the venia legendi. Stark accepted his first C3 professorship for the chair of pharmaceutical/medicinal chemistry at the Johann Wolfgang Goethe University in Frankfurt am Main and received the W3 professorship in 2007. In 2013, he accepted a call to Heinrich Heine University Düsseldorf for a W3 professorship in pharmaceutical and medicinal chemistry. In 2016, Stark received an honorary doctorate from the University of Niš in Serbia for his outstanding research achievements and his commitment to intensify collaboration. From 2004 to 2019, Holger Stark was Editor-in-Chief of the Archiv der Pharmazie. Stark is the author of over 240 original papers, review articles and book chapters. He has been involved in ten international patent families, with 60 national applications.

Scientific research 
Holger Stark has devoted his academic career to drug discovery. His research focuses on the development of new, synthetic receptor ligands for G protein-coupled receptors, mainly histamine and dopamine receptors, with high affinity and selectivity. The combination of chemical synthesis and rational drug design with pharmacological and cell-biological testing is used on one hand to develop pharmacological tools, such as fluorescent ligands, and on the other to get potential new drug candidates for diseases such as Parkinson's disease, Alzheimer's disease or schizophrenia, to restore healthy body functions. Further pharmaceutical-medical research areas are NMDA receptor ligands, sphingolipids, enzyme inhibitors (monoamine oxidase, cholinesterase), cyclooxygenase and arachidonate-5-lipoxygenase and ion channels.

Memberships 
Since 2014, he has led the DPhG state group Rheinland. He is also a member of the German Chemical Society (GdCh), the European Histamine Research Society (EHRS) and the Frankfurt Pharmacy School e.V., which he co-founded.

Awards and honours 

 1992 Joachim Tiburtius Prize 1992 (recognition prize) from the State of Berlin for an outstanding dissertation, Berlin
 1997/2004 PHOENIX Pharmacy Science Prizes for pharmaceutical chemistry from PHOENIX Pharmahandel AG & Co., Heidelberg and Erlangen
 2000 Call for pharmaceutical / medicinal chemistry (C3) at the Johann Wolfgang Goethe University in Frankfurt am Main (accepted)
 2005 Call for pharmaceutical chemistry (W3) at the Technical University Carolo-Wilhelmina in Braunschweig (declined)
 2007 Professor of Pharmaceutical / Medicinal Chemistry (W3) at the Johann Wolfgang Goethe University in Frankfurt am Main
 2008 Appointment to the Chair of Pharmaceutical Chemistry at the Leopold Franzens University, Innsbruck/Austria (declined)
 2008 Hessian University Prize for Excellence in Teaching 2008 "Project of a working group or organizational unit" 4th place
 2013 Professor of Pharmaceutical and Medicinal Chemistry (W3) at Heinrich Heine University Düsseldorf (accepted)
 2016 Honorary Doctorate from the University of Niš, Serbia 2018 Heinrich Heine University Prize for Excellence in Teaching 2018 for "Innovative teaching concept" for the first-semester excursion "Pharmanauts"

References

External links

1962 births
Living people
Free University of Berlin alumni
German pharmacists
Academic staff of Heinrich Heine University Düsseldorf
German pharmacologists
German medical researchers
Scientists from Lower Saxony